Kvæfjord is a municipality in Troms og Finnmark county, Norway. It is part of the traditional region of Central Hålogaland. The administrative centre of the municipality is the village of Borkenes. Other villages include Hundstad, Langvassbukta, and Revsnes.

Together with Harstad, the two municipalities cover a large part of the island of Hinnøya in the southern part of the Troms county. Kvæfjord consists mostly of mountains and fjords. The municipality centers on the Kvæfjorden and Gullesfjorden.

Kvæfjord is also where the Norwegian national cake, Kvæfjord cake, originally comes from.

The  municipality is the 208th largest by area out of the 356 municipalities in Norway. Kvæfjord is the 238th most populous municipality in Norway with a population of 2,789.

General information

Kvæfjord was established as a municipality on 1 January 1838 (see formannskapsdistrikt law). On 25 October 1956, a part of Kvæfjord (population: 32) was transferred to neighboring Trondenes municipality. On 1 January 2000, the part of Kvæfjord that surrounded the Godfjorden (population: 102) was transferred from Kvæfjord to Sortland municipality (in neighboring Nordland county).

On 1 January 2020, the municipality became part of the newly formed Troms og Finnmark county. Previously, it had been part of the old Troms county.

Name
The municipality (originally the parish) is named after local fjord known as the Kvæfjorden since the first Kvæfjord Church was built along the shore of the fjord. The first element is the genitive case of the name of the island  (now known as Kvæøya) which lies in the fjord. The name of the island might be derived from the word  which means "belly" or "stomach". Prior to 1889, the name was spelled Kvædfjord.

Coat of arms
The coat of arms was granted on 4 April 1986. The official blazon is "Vert, a strawberry plant Or". This means the arms have a green field (background) and the charge is a strawberry plant. The strawberry plant has a tincture of Or which means it is commonly colored yellow, but if it is made out of metal, then gold is used. The green color in the field symbolizes the importance of agriculture in the municipality, along with fertility, growth, and renewal. The strawberry was chosen since it is the northernmost municipality in Norway where strawberries are produced commercially. The arms were designed by Arvid Sveen.

Churches
The Church of Norway has one parish within the municipality of Kvæfjord. It is part of the Trondenes prosti (deanery) in the Diocese of Nord-Hålogaland.

Economy

The municipality is known for agriculture and farming. The quality of the strawberries is famous. The long hours of daylight, combined with relatively low summer temperatures, make the strawberries more tasteful than berries grown in warmer climates.

A large institution for the mentally handicapped was once located in Kvæfjord. It employed a large number of health workers.

Geography
The municipality is located on Hinnøya island and it is split by three smaller branches of the large Andfjorden: Gullesfjorden, Kvæfjorden, and Godfjorden. The island of Kvæøya is located in the middle of the Kvæfjorden, across from Borkenes.

The landscape of today was largely formed during the last ice age. It is in this belt of old seabed that today's best farm land is located. There are four county roads connecting the municipality: two to the north and one each to the east and south.

Climate
Kvæfjord has a subpolar oceanic climate, and is mild for the high latitude. The wettest season is September - January, and the driest season is April - August.

Government
All municipalities in Norway, including Kvæfjord, are responsible for primary education (through 10th grade), outpatient health services, senior citizen services, unemployment and other social services, zoning, economic development, and municipal roads. The municipality is governed by a municipal council of elected representatives, which in turn elect a mayor.  The municipality falls under the Trondenes District Court and the Hålogaland Court of Appeal.

Municipal council
The municipal council  of Kvæfjord is made up of 23 representatives that are elected to four year terms. The party breakdown of the council is as follows:

Mayors
The mayors of Kvæfjord:

1838–1839: Lorents R. Normann  
1840–1841: Christian Ernst Qvale 
1842-1842: Christian Tomassen 
1843–1845: August Torvald Deinboll 
1846-1846: Anders Fochsen
1847–1848: Peder Olsen Svanem  
1849–1852: Tellef Martin Bang 
1853–1854: Peder Elias Wulff 
1855–1856: Tellef Martin Bang 
1857–1860: Peder Elias Wulff 
1861–1862: Christian Tomassen  
1863–1866: Peder Elias Wulff 
1867–1870: Jesper Jespersen 
1871–1872: Peder Elias Wulff 
1873–1874: Edias Fochsen  
1875–1894: L. B. Drevland 
1895–1907: Bendiks E. Vik 
1908–1922: Jørg. Pedersen  
1923–1928: Matias Johan Torheim (Bp)
1929–1941: Ole Olsen  
1945–1947: Ivar Størkersen  
1948–1957: Vidar Pleym 
1958–1959: Jac. Norman 
1960–1963: Halfdan D. Johansen 
1964–1971: Christian Høyersten
1972–1979: Rasmus Torheim 
1980–1981: Christian Høyersten 
1982–1985: Asbjørn Hessen (V)
1986–1995: Bendiks H. Arnesen (Ap)
1995–2003: Asbjørn Olafson (Ap)
2003–2011: Lillian Hessen (V)
2011–present: Torbjørn Larsen (Ap)

Notable people 

 Johanne Nielsdatter (born in Kvæfjord, died 1695) the last Norwegian woman to be executed for witchcraft
 Mikkel Røg (ca. 1679 in Kvæfjord – ca. 1737) Danish-Norwegian medal engraver to the French Royal Court 1720 to 1737
 Birger Bergersen (1891 in Kvæfjord – 1977) was a Norwegian anatomist, politician, academic professor, rector, diplomat and chairman of the International Whaling Commission
 Fritz Aagesen (1935 in Kvæfjord – 1998) a Norwegian author of two books of ghost stories
 Karl Erik Harr (born 1940 in Kvæfjord) a Norwegian painter, illustrator, graphic artist and author
 Bendiks H. Arnesen (born 1951 in Kvæfjord) politician, Mayor of Kvæfjord 1986 to 1995
 Ivar Andreas Forn (born 1983 in Kvæfjord) a retired football goalkeeper with over 100 club caps

Media gallery

References

External links
Municipal fact sheet from Statistics Norway 

 
Municipalities of Troms og Finnmark
1838 establishments in Norway